The Guayanan Highlands moist forests (NT0124) is an ecoregion in the south of Venezuela and the north of Brazil and in Guyana, Suriname, French Guiana. It is in the Amazon biome.
It encompasses an upland region with diverse fauna and flora, which contains dramatic tepuis, or sandstone table mountains. 
The region has been inaccessible in the past and is generally fairly intact, apart from the north and northeast where large scale agriculture, ranching and mining operations are steadily encroaching on the ecosystem. New roads are opening the interior to logging, and planned dams will have a drastic impact on the riparian zones.

Location

The ecoregion includes parts of southern Venezuela, western and southern Guyana and northern Brazil, with scattered portions in Suriname and French Guiana.
It extends into eastern Colombia.
The ecoregion lies on the Guiana Shield, an ancient upland area between the Amazon and Orinoco basins.
It is surrounded by lowland grassy savannas and lowland forest.
All areas of the ecoregion contains enclaves of the Pantepuis ecoregion on the tops of table mountains.

Most areas of the ecoregion in the east are surrounded by the Guianan moist forests ecoregion, and most areas in the west are surrounded by the Guianan piedmont and lowland moist forests ecoregion. 
Sections of the ecoregion in the east border the Uatuma-Trombetas moist forests to the south.
The central part of the ecoregion surrounds the northern part of the largest section of the Guianan savanna ecoregion 
The southwestern part of the ecoregion rises above the Negro-Branco moist forests ecoregion.
The Guayanan Highlands moist forests and the Tepuis together make up the Guayanan Highlands Forests Global 200 ecoregion.

Physical
The Guayanan Highlands ecoregion is an "island" of higher land surrounded by lower grasslands and forests collectively known as the Guiana Shield.
Most of the land drains into the Orinoco through the Ventuari, Caroní, Paragua and Caura rivers in Venezuela.
In the south, it is drained by the Uraricoera and Branco rivers in Brazil into the Amazon.

The upland terraces and mountains consist mainly of quartzitic or sandstone rocks, with granitic rock in some areas.
The lowland plains are recent, formerly flooded by lakes or by the sea.
Most of the landscape is forest-covered rolling peneplains and floodplains.
Soils are mostly sandy and low in nutrients.

Ecology

The Guianan Highlands moist forests ecoregion is in the Neotropical realm and the tropical and subtropical moist broadleaf forests biome.

Climate

The Köppen climate classification is "Am": equatorial, monsoonal.
Temperatures vary little throughout the year.
Annual rainfall varies considerably, but in some areas averages .

Flora

There are various habitats including large areas of tall primary rainforest, open savannas and gallery forests.
Common trees on the plains include Micropholis melinoniana, Dacryodes species, Euterpe precatoria and Quassia cedron. 
There are fewer emergent trees in the hilly areas, where tree species include Newtonia suaveolens, Couratari guanensis, Alexa species, Euterpe precatoria and Micrandra minor.

The seasonally flooded forests along the rivers have similar formations of flora to the Amazon region.
Common tree species on the upper Orinoco include Combretum frangulifolium, Gustavia augusta, Pterocarpus species, Etaballia dubia, Albizia corymbosa, Spondias mombin, Mabea nitida, Eschweilera tenuifolia, Astrocaryum aculeatum and Inga species. 
Floodplain trees include Caryocar microcarpum, Caraipa densifolia, Macrolobium acaciaefolium, Abuta grandfolia and Panopsis rubescens.

Fauna

209 species of mammals have been recorded, including jaguar (Panthera onca), cougar (Puma concolor), South American tapir (Tapirus terrestris), white-lipped peccary (Tayassu pecari), collared peccary (Pecari tajacu), brocket deer (Mazama genus), white-eared opossum (Didelphis albiventris), big lutrine opossum (Lutreolina crassicaudata), Robinson's mouse opossum (Marmosa robinsoni), Davy's naked-backed bat (Pteronotus davyi), Fernandez's sword-nosed bat (Lonchorhina fernandezi), highland yellow-shouldered bat (Sturnira ludovici), eastern lowland olingo (Bassaricyon alleni), fiery squirrel (Sciurus flammifer), Guyanan spiny rat (Proechimys hoplomyoides) and Orinoco agouti (Dasyprocta guamara).
Endangered mammals include black bearded saki (Chiropotes satanas), Fernandez's sword-nosed bat (Lonchorhina fernandezi) and giant otter (Pteronura brasiliensis).

Snakes include fer-de-lance (Bothrops asper), palm pit-vipers (Bothriechis genus), coral snakes (Micrurus genus), boa constrictors (Boa constrictor) and bushmasters (Lachesis muta). There are many green iguanas (Iguana iguana) and tegus lizards (Tupinambis genus).
Endangered amphibians include the demonic poison frog (Minyobates steyermarki).

631 species of birds have been recorded, including white-cheeked pintail (Anas bahamensis), aplomado falcon (Falco femoralis), brown-throated parakeet (Eupsittula pertinax), pavonine cuckoo (Dromococcyx pavoninus), Middle American screech owl (Megascops guatemalae), burrowing owl (Athene cunicularia), emeralds and hummingbirds in the Amazilia genus, chestnut-tipped toucanet (Aulacorhynchus derbianus), smoke-colored pewee (Contopus fumigatus), orange-crowned oriole (Icterus auricapillus), grey seedeater (Sporophila intermedia), two-banded warbler (Myiothlypis bivittata) and black-backed water tyrant (Fluvicola albiventer).
Endangered birds include the yellow-bellied seedeater (Sporophila nigricollis).

Status

The World Wildlife Fund classes the ecoregion as "Relatively Stable/Intact".
The interior forests have been inaccessible in the past and are generally intact, although roads are being built that open them up to logging.
Logging is illegal in the state of Amazonas, Venezuela, but continues elsewhere.
Legal and illegal mining for gold, diamonds, bauxite, and iron ore are a serious threat.
Near urban centers in the north and northeast of the ecoregion the habitat is steadily being destroyed by large-scale agriculture, cattle ranching and mining.
Planned hydroelectric dams on the  Caroni and Paragua rivers would flood huge areas with devastating effect on the riparian habitats.

Part of UNESCO's Alto Orinoco-Casiquiare Biosphere Reserve lies in the ecoregion.
Protected areas include the El Caura Forest Reserve, Imataca Forest Reserve, Kaieteur National Park, Canaima National Park, and Kanuku Mountains.
There are other national parks, but they are not well funded.
The Pico da Neblina National Park in Brazil and the Parima Tapirapecó and Serranía de la Neblina national parks in Venezuela cover  in total.
There are many smaller conservation units in the region, but they mainly protect the upper levels of the tepuis.

Notes

External links

Sources

 

Ecoregions of Brazil
Ecoregions of Guyana
Ecoregions of Suriname
Ecoregions of Venezuela
Neotropical tropical and subtropical moist broadleaf forests
.
Amazon biome
Montane forests